John Elvin Shaffner (March 3, 1911 – June 11, 2001) was a businessman and political figure in Nova Scotia. He served as the 26th Lieutenant Governor of Nova Scotia from 1978 to 1984. His surname also appears as Schaffner in some sources.

He was born in Lawrencetown, Nova Scotia and was educated there, at Acadia University and at the Bentley School of Accounting and Finance in Boston. In 1936, he married Nell Margaret Potter (she died 30 September 2010). Shaffner worked as a chartered accountant for several years. Later, he was president of 7 Up Maritimes Ltd. and M.W. Graves & Company. He also served on the board of governors for Acadia University. He served as agent-general for Nova Scotia in the United Kingdom and Europe from 1973 to 1976. Shaffner died at the age of 90 in 2001.

References 
 

Lieutenant Governors of Nova Scotia
1911 births
2001 deaths